Sir Torquil Patrick Alexander Norman,  (born 11 April 1933) is a British businessman, aircraft enthusiast, and arts philanthropist.

Early life and education
Norman is the youngest of three sons born to Air Commodore Sir Nigel Norman, 2nd Baronet, and Patrician Moyra Annesley, daughter of Lieutenant Colonel James Howard Adolphus Annesley. His father, the only child of journalist and politician Sir Henry Norman, 1st Baronet, and novelist Ménie Muriel Dowie, was killed in action in 1943, shortly before Torquil's 10th birthday. His eldest brother, Sir Mark Annesley Norman, inherited the baronetcy and his middle brother, Desmond Norman, was an aviation pioneer. 

Norman was educated at Eton College, Harvard University and Trinity College, Cambridge.

Career
Standing 6'7", Norman gained his pilot's licence at eighteen, and did his National Service in the Fleet Air Arm. After he left, he bought a Piper Comanche, flew in No. 601 Squadron RAF, and took up skydiving.

After working as an investment banker in the United States for eleven years, Norman returned to the United Kingdom in the 1960s and subsequently entered the toymaking industry, first as chief executive of Berwick Timpo toy company from 1973. In 1980, he founded Bluebird Toys, makers of the Big Yellow Teapot House, the Big Red Fun Bus, and the successful Polly Pocket line of dolls.

A long-term Camden resident, Norman bought the derelict Roundhouse arts venue in Chalk Farm for £3 million in 1996 "as an impulse buy", having read it was proposed to turn it into an architectural museum. As founder and chairman of the Roundhouse Trust he then raised £27 million from public and private sources, including almost £4 million more of his own personal funds, to restore the crumbling Victorian former railway repair shed, which had been a major arts venue in the 1960s and '70s. The restored Roundhouse reopened in June 2006 as a 1,700 seat performance space, with a state-of-the-art creative centre for young people in the undercroft, and a new wing with a purpose-built bar and café. It was soon the base for a major season by the Royal Shakespeare Company, played host to regular big-name rock concerts, and by 2008 had involved over 12,000 teenagers in creative arts projects.

Norman, who was previously appointed a Commander of the Order of the British Empire, stepped down as chairman of the Roundhouse Trust in 2007, and was knighted the same year for his "services to the arts and to disadvantaged young people". In 2007 he won the Beacon Fellowship Prize for his work with young people through the Roundhouse Trust.

A collector of classic aeroplanes, Norman wrote a vivid account of flying a DH Leopard Moth across the Atlantic. In 1995 Norman and Henry Labouchère undertook a long distance flight in a light aircraft, culminating in their East-West trans-Atlantic flight in a (then) 59-year-old De Havilland Dragonfly, with both of them being awarded the Certificate of Merit by the Royal Aero Club.

Norman went on to found the Global Vehicle Trust (GVT) to provide simple, affordable, and versatile transport for rural areas in developing countries using a purpose-built truck designed and conceptualised by Sir Gordon Murray. GVT established OX Delivers as a for-profit entity to carry out GVT's goals, using a scalable business model that enables electric transport to be accessible, affordable, and reliable in emerging markets. The OX truck has since shifted away from diesel, and was redesigned to be fully electric.

Personal life
On 8 July 1961, Norman married Lady Elizabeth Ann Montagu, the daughter of Victor Montagu, 10th Earl of Sandwich. They have five children, including Conservative Party MP Jesse Norman, the artist Amy Sharrocks, and ten grandchildren.

Published works
 2010 – Kick The Tyres, Light The Fires: One Man's Vision For Britain's Future And How We Can Make It Work. Infinite Ideas. .

See also
 Norman baronets

References

External links

 A. Alvarez, The Last Buccaneer, New Yorker, 15 October 1990, p. 49 
 Winner's Biography: Sir Torquil Norman, The Beacon Fellowship, 2007.

1933 births
British philanthropists
British theatre managers and producers
Businesspeople awarded knighthoods
Commanders of the Order of the British Empire
Knights Bachelor
Alumni of Trinity College, Cambridge
Harvard University alumni
Living people
People educated at Eton College
People from Camden Town
Toy inventors
Younger sons of baronets